Benjamin Etter (1763–1827) was a silversmith and militia officer in Halifax, Nova Scotia.   Born in Braintree, Massachusetts and the son of Peter Etter, Etter arrived in Halifax from Boston at the outbreak of the American Revolution.  He was an officer in the Nova Scotia militia (1796–1808), and served as an honorary aide-de-camp to Prince Edward.  He purchased with James Woodill the privateer Earl of Dublin and the General Bowyer.

References 

1763 births
1827 deaths
Loyalists who settled Nova Scotia
American Loyalists from Massachusetts